Qasemabad-e Laklak (also Romanized as Qāsemābād-e Laklak; also known as Qāsemābād) is a village in Jolgeh Rural District, in the Central District of Asadabad County, Hamadan Province, Iran. At the 2006 census, its population was 701, in 175 families.

References 

Populated places in Asadabad County